Carolina Forest is a census-designated place (CDP) in Horry County, South Carolina, United States. It was first listed as a CDP in the 2020 census with a population of 23,342.

It is located west of Myrtle Beach and east of Conway in an area planned by International Paper in the late 1990s. Most of the development follows the Carolina Forest Master Plan, developed cooperatively between International Paper and the Horry County Government.

Carolina Forest also includes the unincorporated community of Pine Island.

Geography 
Carolina Forest is situated west of the Intracoastal Waterway; between U.S. Route 501 and International Drive. Carolina Forest was developed in and around existing Longleaf Pine forests and savannas, within the Waccamaw River watershed, part of the greater lower watershed of the Pee Dee River. The topography of the region between the Waccamaw River and the Intracoastal Waterway is spotted with Carolina Bays, which are elliptical-shaped depressions in the land, often filled with thick vegetation and rich in biodiversity.

History 
Carolina Forest was once part of a larger tract of land in eastern Horry County called the Buist Tract. Originally owned by Burroughs & Chapin, International Paper bought the  Buist Tract in 1937. It was used as part of the Conway Bombing and Gunnery Range during World War II. In 1960, the company donated part of the tract for what is now Coastal Carolina University (located several miles away from Carolina Forest).

In June 1994, Kylee Mueller sold  of the remaining  of the Buist Tract to Horry County Schools for development of Carolina Forest Elementary School, Carolina Forest Middle School, and Carolina Forest High School. In addition,  were sold to form a golf course and residential property.

By the end of 1994, International Paper began to sell more of its land. Due to the lack of funding from other sources for road infrastructure, the first  of Carolina Forest Boulevard were completed by November 1995 by International Paper. Further expansions of both Carolina Forest Boulevard and River Oaks Drive (creating an  loop) would open up  to development west of the Intracoastal Waterway. Carolina Forest Boulevard was completed in December 1996, with River Oaks Drive being completed in December 1997.

On December 2, 1997, Horry County council voted to freeze zoning rules in an  area of Carolina Forest for 20 years in exchange for land to build parks and roads in an 8–3 vote on the development agreement. An estimated 35,000 people would live in the  covered by the agreement. In the agreement, Horry County did not require International Paper to widen Carolina Forest Boulevard or River Oaks Drive to four lanes. Land would be given to the county at no cost for the then-future SC Highway 31 north and south of the Robert Grissom Parkway bridge. Approximately  was set aside for future schools, which would include Ocean Bay Elementary and Middle Schools. Because nearly half of Carolina Forest was open space, the area was exempt from future open space directives set by Horry County.

According to the 2010 census, Carolina Forest's population increased from 3400 in 2000 to 21,000.

Education
Carolina Forest has a public library, a branch of the Horry County Memorial Library.

Demographics

2020 census

Note: the US Census treats Hispanic/Latino as an ethnic category. This table excludes Latinos from the racial categories and assigns them to a separate category. Hispanics/Latinos can be of any race.

References

External links

 Carolina Forest Master Plan

Census-designated places in South Carolina
Census-designated places in Horry County, South Carolina
Unincorporated communities in South Carolina
Unincorporated communities in Horry County, South Carolina